

General Walter-Otto Weiß, also spelt Weiss  (5 September 1890 – 21 December 1967), was a German general during World War II. In 1945 he became commander in chief of Army Group North on the Eastern Front. He was a recipient of the Knight's Cross of the Iron Cross with Oak Leaves.

Career
Weiss was born in Tilsit, East Prussia and joined the Army on 19 March 1908. At the beginning of the Second World War, during the Polish Campaign, he was given command of I. Army Corps, holding the position chief of the general staff on 1 September. On 15 December 1940 he took command of the 97th Light Division, and on 15 January 1941 command of the 26th Infantry Division. This Division was subordinated to Army Group Centre and participated in Operation Barbarossa. Weiss took command of the XXVII Army Corps on 1 July 1942. Weiss led the 2nd Army on the Eastern Front from 3 February 1943 on. He received command of Army Group North on 12 March 1945 with which he surrendered to the American forces.

Awards 
 Iron Cross (1914)  2nd Class (9 September 1914) & 1st Class (15 December 1915)

 Clasp to the Iron Cross (1939) 2nd Class (19 September 1939) & 1st Class (2 October 1939)
 German Cross in Gold on 19 February 1943 as General der Infanterie and commanding general of the XXVII. Armeekorps
 Knight's Cross of the Iron Cross with Oak Leaves
 Knight's Cross on 12 September 1941 as Generalmajor and commander of the 26.Infanterie-Division
 Oak Leaves on 5 November 1944 as Generaloberst and Commander-in-Chief of the 2. Armee

References

Citations

Bibliography

External link

1890 births
1967 deaths
German Army generals of World War II
Colonel generals of the German Army (Wehrmacht)
Recipients of the Knight's Cross of the Iron Cross with Oak Leaves
People from Tilsit
People from East Prussia
German Army personnel of World War I
Recipients of the clasp to the Iron Cross, 1st class
Officers of the Order of Military Merit (Bulgaria)
Reichswehr personnel